Grynocharis is a genus of bark-gnawing beetles in the family Lophocateridae. There are at least four described species in Grynocharis.

Species
These four species belong to the genus Grynocharis:
 Grynocharis oblonga (Linnaeus, 1758) g
 Grynocharis oregonensis (C.Schaeffer, 1918) g
 Grynocharis pubescens (Erichson, 1844) g
 Grynocharis quadrilineata (Melsheimer, 1844) g b
Data sources: i = ITIS, c = Catalogue of Life, g = GBIF, b = Bugguide.net

References

Further reading

External links

 

Cleroidea
Cleroidea genera